This is a list of foreign players that have played in the Canadian Premier League. The following players:
Have played at least one CPL regular season game. Players who were signed by CPL clubs, but only played in playoff games, Canadian Championship games, or did not play in any competitive games at all, are not included.
Are considered foreign, i.e., outside Canada determined by the following:
''A player is considered foreign if he is not eligible to play for the national team of Canada.

More specifically,
If a player has been capped at international level, the national team is used; if he has been capped by more than one country, the highest level (or the most recent) team is used. These include Canadian players with dual citizenship.
If a player has not been capped at international level, his country of birth is used, except those who were born abroad from Canadian parents, or moved to Canada at a young age, and those who clearly indicated to have switched his nationality to another nation.

Current
This is a list of players currently occupying one of the seven spots designated for foreign players. Canadian Premier League teams may sign a maximum of seven international players, out of which only five can be in the starting lineup for each match. The following players are considered foreign players for the 2022 season. This list does not include Canadian citizens who represent other countries at international level.

Players in bold denote players who have been capped at senior international level.

All-Time
Players in bold denote players who have been capped at senior international level.

Africa (CAF)

Cameroon
Bertrand Owundi – Forge FC – 2019
Jeannot Esua – FC Edmonton – 2019–

Congo
Dominique Malonga – Cavalry FC – 2019

DR Congo
Sharly Mabussi – FC Edmonton – 2021–

Senegal
Elimane Cissé – Forge FC – 2019–2021

Asia (AFC)

Japan
Kodai Iida – HFX Wanderers – 2019
Wataru Murofushi – York9 – 2019–2020

South Korea
Son Yong-chan – FC Edmonton – 2019–

Europe (UEFA)

Albania
Rezart Rama – Forge FC – 2022–

Belgium
Oumar Diouck – FC Edmonton – 2019
Mathias Janssens – Valour FC – 2019
Daniel Krutzen – Forge FC – 2019–
Paolo Sabak – Forge FC – 2020–2021

Croatia
Josip Golubar – Valour FC – 2019

England
Cory Bent – HFX Wanderers – 2020– 
Jordan Brown – Cavalry FC – 2019–2020
Stephen Hoyle – Valour FC – 2019 
Nathan Mavila – Cavalry FC – 2019–2020
Adam Mitter – Valour FC – 2019
Vashon Neufville – Atlético Ottawa – 2020–2021

France
Abdoul Sissoko - Atlético Ottawa - 2022

Germany
Julian Büscher – Cavalry FC – 2019
Julian Roloff – Cavalry FC – 2022–
Peter Schaale – HFX Wanderers – 2019– 
Hendrik Starostzik – Pacific FC – 2019
Tobias Warschewski – FC Edmonton – 2021–

Ireland
Tom Field – Cavalry FC – 2021–
Joe Mason – Cavalry FC – 2021–

Italy
Michele Paolucci – Valour FC – 2019

Netherlands
Daan Klomp – Cavalry FC – 2021–
Bradley Vliet – Cavalry FC – 2022–

Northern Ireland
Ollie Bassett – Pacific – 2021, Atlético Ottawa – 2022–

Spain
Miguel Acosta – Atlético Ottawa – 2021– 
Diego Espejo – Atlético Ottawa – 2022– 
José Galán – Valour FC – 2019–2020, 2021– 
Viti Martínez – Atlético Ottawa – 2020–2021 
Iván Pérez – Atlético Ottawa – 2022
Ramón Soria – FC Edmonton – 2019–
Alberto Soto – Atlético Ottawa – 2021
Ignacio Zabal – Atlético Ottawa – 2020

Sweden
Alexander Achinioti-Jönsson – Forge FC – 2019– 
Simon Adjei – York9 – 2019
Erik Zetterberg – FC Edmonton – 2020

North and Central America, Caribbean (CONCACAF)

Dominican Republic
Rafael Núñez – Atlético Ottawa – 2021

Haiti
Bicou Bissainthe – FC Edmonton – 2022–
James Marcelin – FC Edmonton – 2019

Honduras
José Escalante – Cavalry FC – 2019–

Jamaica
Alex Marshall – HFX Wanderers – 2020– 
Tevin Shaw – Atlético Ottawa – 2020–2021

Mexico
Francisco Acuña – Atlético Ottawa – 2020
Alejandro Díaz – Pacific FC – 2020–2022
Vladimir Moragrega – Atlético Ottawa – 2022

Panama
Alexander González – Pacific FC – 2019

Trinidad and Tobago
Akeem Garcia – HFX Wanderers – 2019– 
Elton John – HFX Wanderers – 2019
Kareem Moses – FC Edmonton – 2019–2020
Andre Rampersad – HFX Wanderers – 2019–
Jan-Michael Williams – HFX Wanderers – 2019–2020

United States
Hunter Gorskie – FC Edmonton – 2021–

South America (CONMEBOL)

Brazil
Richard Luca – Cavalry FC – 2020– 
Oliver Minatel – Cavalry FC – 2019–
João Morelli – HFX Wanderers – 2020– 
Eriks Santos – HFX Wanderers – 2020–

Chile
Rodrigo Gattas – York9 – 2019

Colombia
Luis Perea – HFX Wanderers – 2019
Kevin Rendón – Valour FC – 2022–

Peru
Jair Córdova – Cavalry FC – 2020
Juan Gutiérrez – HFX Wanderers – 2019
Raúl Tito – FC Edmonton – 2020–

Uruguay
Martín Arguiñarena – Valour FC – 2019

See also

 List of foreign CSL players
 List of foreign MLS players

References

 
foreign CPL players
Lists of association football players
Canada
 
Association football player non-biographical articles